Das Lakshana or Paryushana is the most important annual holy event for Jains and is usually celebrated in August or September in Hindi calendar (indian calendar) Bhadrapad Month's Shukla Paksha. Jains increase their level of spiritual intensity often using fasting and prayer/meditation to help. The five main vows are emphasized during this time. There are no set rules, and followers are encouraged to practice according to their ability and desires.

Normally, Digambaras refer it as Das Lakshana Dharma while Śvētāmbaras refer to it as Paryushana ("abiding" or "coming together"). The duration of Paryushana is for 8 days for Śvētāmbara Jains and 10 days for Jains belonging to the Digambara sect. The festival ends with the celebration of Samvatsari or Kshamavani (forgiveness day).

Meaning 
Paryushana means "abiding and coming together". It is a time when the Jains take on vows of study and fasting.

Observances 

The Digambara Jains recite the ten chapters of the sacred Jain text, Tattvartha Sutra on ten days of fasting. The sixth day of the festival is celebrated as  Sugandh Dashami by the Digambar Community. Digambaras celebrate Ananta Chaturdashi on which a special worship is done. Many towns have a procession leading to the main Jain temple. Ananta Chaturdashi marks the day when Lord Vasupujya, the 12th Jain Tirthankar, attained Moksha (nirvana).

At the conclusion of the festival, followers request forgiveness from others for any offenses committed during the last year. Forgiveness is asked by saying Micchami Dukkadam or Uttam Kshama to others, which means, "If I have offended you in any way, knowingly or unknowingly, in thought, word or action, then I seek your forgiveness."

During the eight-day festival, the Śvētāmbara Murtipujakas recite the Kalpa Sūtra, which includes a recitation of the section on the birth of Mahavira on the fifth day. Some Śvētāmbara Sthānakavāsīs recite the Antagada Sutra, which details the life of 90 great men and women who attained moksha during the eras of the 22nd Tirthankar Neminatha and 24th Tirthankar Mahavira.

Fasting 

During Paryushana, Jains observe a fast. The span of the fast can last from a day to 30 days or even more. In both Digambara and Shwetambara, śrāvakas (laypersons) do a fast by having boiled water only which can be consumed between sunrise and sunset.

Requesting forgiveness 

At the conclusion of the festival, śrāvakas request each other for forgiveness for all offenses committed during the last year. This occurs on the Paryusha day for Śvētāmbaras and on the Prathama (first day) of the month of Ashvin Krashna for Digambaras. Forgiveness is asked by saying Micchami Dukkadam or Uttam Kshama to each other. It means "If I have caused you offence in any way, knowingly or unknowingly, in thought word or deed, then I seek your forgiveness".

Dashlakshana Dharma 

Das-Dharma (ten righteous virtues) are mentioned in the Jain text, Tattvartha Sutra.
These are:
 Uttam Kshama (forbearance) - उत्तम क्षमा 
 Uttam Mardava (supreme modesty) - उत्तम मार्दव 
 Uttam Aarjava (straightforwardness) - उत्तम आर्जव 
 Uttam Shauch (purity) - उत्तम शौच
 Uttam Satya (truth) - उत्तम सत्य
 Uttam Sanyam (supreme restraint) - उत्तम संयम
 Uttam Tap (austerity) - उत्तम तप
 Uttam Tyaga (renunciation) - उत्तम त्याग
 Uttam Aakinchanya (non-attachment) and - उत्तम अकिंचन्य
 Uttam Brahmcharya (supreme celibacy) - उत्तम बह्मचर्य

In the full form, it is a 10-day vrata that comes every year. It may be undertaken during Shukla Panchami to Chaturdashi of Bhadrapada, Magh or Chaitra months. However it is common to do it during Bhadrapada.

The Das-dharmas are all prefixed by the word ‘Uttam’ (Supreme) to signify that they are practiced at the highest level by the Jain monks. The householder practises them to a lesser extent. It lasts over a period of ten days, each day being dedicated to one of the ten Dharmas.
In the sections below a) stands for the temporary point of view of modes and modification (vyavahar nay)
b) stands for the permanent point of view of underlying substance (nīshyānay).

Forgiveness (Uttam Kshama) : उत्तम क्षमा 

a) We forgive those who have wronged us and seek forgiveness from those we have wronged. Forgiveness is sought not just from human colleagues, but from all living beings ranging from one sensed to five sensed. If we do not forgive or seek forgiveness but instead harbor resentment, we bring misery and unhappiness on ourselves and in the process shatter our peace of mind and make enemies. Forgiving and seeking forgiveness oils the wheel of life allowing us to live in harmony with our fellow beings. It also attracts meritorious karma.

b) Forgiveness here is directed to oneself. The soul, in a state of mistaken identity or false belief, assumes that it consists of the body, the karmas and the emotions – likes, dislikes, anger, pride etc. As a result of this incorrect belief, it inflicts pain upon itself and is thus the cause of its own misery. Nischay Kshama Dharma teaches the soul to correctly identify itself by encouraging it to contemplate in its true nature and hence achieve the state of right Belief (Samyak Darshan). It is only by achieving Samyak Darshan that the soul ceases to inflict pain on itself and attains supreme happiness.

Modesty/Humility (Uttam Maardav) : उत्तम मार्दव 

a) Wealth, good looks, reputable family or intelligence often lead to pride. Pride means to believe one to be superior to others and to look down on others. By being proud you are measuring your worth by temporary material objects. These objects will either leave you or you will be forced to leave them when you die. These eventualities will cause you unhappiness as a result of the ‘dent’ caused to your self-worth. Being humble will prevent this. Pride also leads to the influx of the bad karmas.

b) All the souls are equal, none being superior or inferior to another. The Nischay view encourages one to understand their true nature. All souls have the potential to be liberated souls. The only difference between the liberated souls and those in bondage is that the former have attained liberation as a result of their ‘effort’. With effort, even the latter can achieve liberation.

Straightforwardness (Uttam Aarjav) : उत्तम आर्जव 
a) The action of a deceitful person is to think one thing, speak something else and do something entirely different. There is no harmony in their thought, speech and actions. Such a person loses credibility very quickly and lives in constant anxiety and fear of their deception being exposed. Being straightforward or honest, oils the wheel of life. You will be seen to be reliable and trustworthy. Deceitful actions lead to the influx of karmas.

b) Delusion about one's identity is the root cause of unhappiness. The soul is made up of countless qualities like knowledge, happiness, effort, faith, and conduct. It has the potential to achieve omniscience (Kevala Gyana केवल ज्ञान) and reach a state of supreme bliss. Again, the body, the karmas, the thoughts and all the emotions are separate from the true nature of the soul. Only by practicing Nischay Arjav Dharma will one taste the true happiness that comes from within.

Truth (Uttam Satya) : उत्तम सत्य 
a) If talking is not required, then do not talk. If it is required then only use the minimum of words, and all must all be absolutely true. Talking disturbs the stillness of the mind. Consider the person who lies and lives in fear of being exposed. To support one lie they have to utter a hundred more. They become caught up in a tangled web of lies and is seen as untrustworthy and unreliable. Lying leads to an influx of karma.

b) Satya comes from the word Sat, whose one of the meaning is "existence". Existence is a quality of the soul. Recognising the soul's true nature as it really exists and taking shelter in the soul is practising Nischay Satya Dharma.

Contentment/Purity (Uttam Shauch) : उत्तम शौच 
Contentment or happiness, derived from material objects, is only perceived to be so by a soul in a state of false belief. The fact is that material objects do not have a quality of happiness and therefore happiness cannot be obtained from them. The perception of ‘enjoying’ material objects is only a perception. This perception rewards the soul with only misery and nothing else. Real happiness comes from within, as it is the soul that possesses the quality of happiness. In order to dwell in pure soul (शुध्द आत्मा) and enjoy the bliss, the accumulated filth of karma (material attachments, jealousy, anger, lust, greed, Physical pleasures etc.) ought to be cleaned up. The process of cleaning up is called the Purity Dharma (पवित्रता धर्म). With this understanding we free our soul of any karmic impurities, and false beliefs.

Self-Restraint (Uttam Sanyam) : उत्तम संयम 
a) Temporary (Vyavahara nay)
1. Restraining from injury to life – Jains go to great lengths, compared to other world religions, to protect life. This encompasses all living beings, from one-sensed onwards. The purpose of not eating root vegetables is that they contain countless one-sensed beings termed ‘nigod’. During Paryushana the Jains also do not eat green vegetables to reduce harm to the lower sensed beings.
2. Self-restraint from desires or passions – These lead to pain and are therefore to be avoided.

b) Permanent (nīshyānay)
1. Restraining injury to the self – This has been elaborated upon in Nischay Kshma Dharma.
2. Self-restraint from desires or passions – Emotions, e.g. likes, dislikes or anger lead to misery and need to be eradicated. They are not part of the true nature of the soul and only arise when the soul is in a state of false belief. The only method to free oneself from these is to contemplate on the true nature of the soul and in the process commence the journey to liberation or moksha.

Penance (Uttam Tap) : उत्तम तप 
a) This does not only mean fasting but also includes a reduced diet, restriction of certain types of foods, avoiding tasty foods, etc. The purpose of penance is to keep desires and passions in control. Over-indulgence inevitably leads to misery. Penance leads to an influx of meritorious karmas.

b) Meditation prevents the rise of desires and passions in the soul. In a deep state of meditation the desire to intake food does not arise. The first Tirthankara, Rishabha is said to have meditative in such a state for six months, during which he observed Nischay Uttam Tap.

Renunciation (Uttam Tyaag) : उत्तम त्याग 
a) Renouncing worldly possessions leads to a life of contentment and assists in keeping desires in check. Controlling desires not only leads to an influx of meritorious karma, but also absolving oneself from bad karma. Renunciation is done at the highest level by Jain ascetics who renounce not only the household but also their clothes. A person's strength is measured not by the amount of wealth they accumulate but by the amount of wealth they renounce.

b) Renouncing the emotions, the root cause of misery, is supreme renunciation, which is only possible by contemplating on the true nature of the soul.

Non-attachment (Uttam Akinchanya) : उत्तम अकिंचन्य 
a) This assists the person in detaching from external possessions. Historically ten possessions are listed in Jain scriptures: ‘land, house, silver, gold, wealth, grain, female servants, male servants, garments and utensils’. Being unattached from these, helps control our desires and leads to an influx of meritorious karmas.

b) This assists us in being unattached from our internal attachments: false belief, anger, pride, deceit, greed, laughter, liking, disliking, lamentation, fear, disgust, sexual desires. Ridding the soul of these leads to its purification.

Supreme Celibacy (Uttam Brahmacharya) : उत्तम बह्मचर्य 
a) This means refraining from all pleasures associated with the sense of touch, e.g. a cool breeze on a hot summer day or using a cushion for a hard surface. The monks practice this to the highest degree with all their body, speech and mind.

b) Brahmacharya is derived from the word Brahma – Soul and Charya – to dwell. Nischay Brahmacharya means to dwell in your soul. Only by residing in the soul are you the master of the Universe. Residing outside your soul makes you a slave to desires.

Date 
The date for the Paryushana festival is Bhadra shukla panchami. For this minimum duration, Paryushana must be initiated by panchami (the fifth day) of the shukla paksha phase of Bhadra. The last day is called Samvatsari, short for Samvatsari Pratikramana. Because of computational and other differences, there can be some minor differences among various sects. It comes at the time when the wandering monks take up temporary residence for the monsoon period or "cāturmāsa" "four-month". Because at this time the monks have settled in the town for a longer duration, it is time for the householders to have an annual renewal of the faith by listening to the statement of the Dharma and by meditation and vratas (self-control). Digambara Jains starting a 10-day period from Bhadra shukla panchami, during which the dashalakshana vrata is undertaken. Śvētāmbara celebrate an eight-day festival that ends with Bhadrapada shukla chaturthi.

It is believed that the devas (heavenly beings) do an eight-part puja (worship) of the tirthankaras, which takes eight days. Śvētāmbara Jains celebrate this period as Paryushana.

Closure 
In some Indian states, slaughter houses are kept closed for 1–8 days during the Paryushana festival. It is done in states like Rajasthan, Gujarat, Maharashtra, that have large population of the Jain community. On 14 March 2008, The Supreme Court of India held that the ban on slaughter houses in Ahmedabad during Paryushan festival is legal. The court noted:

See also 

 Mahavir Janma Kalyanak
 Ratnatraya
 God in Jainism
 Jain cosmology
 Sallekhana
 Jain festival

References

Citations

Sources

External links 
 Paryuṣaṇ on JAINpedia
 Daśa-lakṣaṇa-parvan on JAINpedia
 Paryushan Pravachan by Jain Muni Rashtrasant Pujya Namramuni MS.

Jain festivals
Religious festivals in India